is a railway station in the town of Kawanehon, Haibara District, Shizuoka Prefecture, Japan, operated by the Ōigawa Railway.

Lines

Station layout
The station has a single island platform connected to a small wooden station building by a level crossing. The station is unattended. It retains much of the atmosphere of the early Shōwa period and is often used as a set for movies and TV dramas.

Adjacent stations

|-
!colspan=5|Ōigawa Railway

Station history
Tanoguchi Station was one of the original stations of the Ōigawa Main Line, and was opened on April 12, 1931.

Passenger statistics
In fiscal 2017, the station was used by an average of 6 passengers daily (boarding passengers only).

Surrounding area
Oi River
Kawanehon town hall

See also
 List of Railway Stations in Japan

References

External links

 Ōigawa Railway home page

Stations of Ōigawa Railway
Railway stations in Shizuoka Prefecture
Railway stations in Japan opened in 1931
Kawanehon, Shizuoka